The following table is the list of urban areas with the largest Armenian population, including in Armenia and the disputed Republic of Artsakh (Nagorno-Karabakh), and the Armenian diaspora.

Most recent data

Historical
Default sorted by Armenian population size

Russian Empire
 
 

1897 census 
Included are towns with more than 5,000 Armenians

 
1916 almanac
Largest Armenian-populated towns in the Caucasus Viceroyalty

Soviet Union

1926 census
Only cities in the Transcaucasian SFSR are listed below

1959 census
Selected cities, including the 3 largest cities in Armenian SSR

1979 census
Selected cities

See also
Armenian population by country
Armenian diaspora
Foreign relations of Armenia

References
Notes

Citations

Bibliography

Armenian diaspora
Armenian